SCORAD ("SCORing Atopic Dermatitis") is a clinical tool for assessing the severity (i.e. extent, intensity) of atopic dermatitis as objectively as possible. It gives approximate weights of 60% to intensity and 20% each to spread (extent) and subjective signs (insomnia, etc.).

It was developed by the European Task Force on Atopic Dermatitis in 1993.

See also
Eczema

References

Atopic dermatitis